Proteans (or the Proteus effect) are unpredictable, subtle, often subconscious, flirting signals, such as a woman's touching of her hair when first meeting a man.
The term was coined by Humphries and Driver in 1970 
for unpredictable behaviour exhibited by prey animals. It was used in the context of human courtship behaviour by Grammer et al. in 2000.

The researchers named the ritual for the shape-shifting Greek god because of the ambiguity of the signals. The name also suggests a first impression, or something that precedes actual flirting. Because of the unconscious nature of proteans, they are not overt invitations to proceed, but more akin to "tells" in a poker game.

One study found that women tend to exhibit interest in the first few minutes of their interactions with strangers regardless of their level of attraction, and only indicated their true level of interest after this time.

These signals often indicate that the sender is trying to decide whether they are interested in the "receiver". However, some individuals, instead of playing along, will overestimate the sender's interest and do something more obvious, like asking for a phone number. This can be clumsy and confusing to both parties, and understanding the concept of protean signals is useful for avoiding such missteps. Misinterpreting those cues and responding to them overeagerly is commonly said to happen to men more than women, although both can suffer when this happens.

See also
 Fidgeting

References

Interpersonal attraction
Nonverbal communication